The 1983 ICF Canoe Sprint World Championships were held in Tampere, Finland for the second time. The Finnish city had host the championships previously in 1973.

The men's competition consisted of six Canadian (single paddle, open boat) and nine kayak events. Three events were held for the women, all in kayak.

This was the eighteenth championships in canoe sprint.

Medal summary

Men's

Canoe

Kayak

Women's

Kayak

Medals table

References
ICF medalists for Olympic and World Championships - Part 1: flatwater (now sprint): 1936-2007.
ICF medalists for Olympic and World Championships - Part 2: rest of flatwater (now sprint) and remaining canoeing disciplines: 1936-2007.

Icf Canoe Sprint World Championships, 1983
Icf Canoe Sprint World Championships, 1983
ICF Canoe Sprint World Championships
Canoeing
Canoeing and kayaking competitions in Finland